Pekal is a Malayic language spoken by around 30,000 people on the island of Sumatra in Indonesia, more specifically in Mukomuko Regency in Bengkulu Province. It should not be confused with Mukomuko language/dialect which is much more closely related but distinct from Pekal. It also has a considerable influence from Rejangese language, which is the most widely spoken language in the province.

Comparison

References

Languages of Indonesia

Malayic languages